Lasantha Manilal Wickrematunge (5 April 1958 – 8 January 2009) was a high-profile Sri Lankan journalist, politician, broadcaster and human rights activist who was assassinated in January 2009.

Wickrematunge was the founder of The Sunday Leader newspaper and Leader Publications and was a virulent critic of the Mahinda Rajapaksa government, and had been locked in a legal battle with Gotabaya Rajapaksa, who was defence secretary at the time and was spearheading the battle against the LTTE rebels. His assassination sent shockwaves across the country, as he was one of the nation's most influential journalists and most well known political figures and raised questions about freedom of expression in the country. Wickrematunge's murder was widely condemned across the world. The Daily Mirror called it the "biggest blow" to media freedom in Sri Lanka, and the Editors Guild held the government responsible for the killing as it has failed to stop attacks against media personnel. The government also expressed shock at the killing, pledging to do everything in its power to catch his killers. Wickrematunge had been on Amnesty International's endangered list since 1998, when anti-tank shells were fired on his house.

Early life 

Lasantha Wickrematunge was the youngest of six born in Kotahena Colombo, to Chandra and Harris Wickrematunge, a prominent politician, who had served as a Municipal Councillor for 30 years
 and was former Deputy Mayor. Wickrematunge was the grandnephew of George E. de Silva and Agnes de Silva, cousin of Minnette de Silva, Fredrick de Silva and Desmond de Silva. In his childhood, Wickrematunge attended St Benedict's College.
He spent his adolescence in Britain, where he graduated high school and eventually returned to Sri Lanka, where he started law school.

Career

Political career
Wickrematunge began his career as a lawyer, practicing as a defense attorney for eight years under Ranjit Abeysuriya. Whilst practicing law, Wickrematunge made his way into the political scene before entering into Journalism starting with The Island and Sun newspapers. Wickrematunge contested in the 1989 Parliamentary election from a Colombo seat with the Sri Lanka Freedom Party and then became the private secretary to the world's first female Prime Minister, Sirimavo Bandaranaike. Wickrematunge then crossed parties moving to the United National Party and was advisor to Ranil Wickremasinghe and was often dubbed as the "De facto Opposition Leader".

Journalism  

In 1994 Wickrematunge started the Sunday Leader with his brother Lal Wickrematunge. In addition to Sunday Leader, Wickrematunge was the Editorial Board Director for the Sinhalese Sunday newspaper Iruresa (launched 2004) and the Wednesday English paper Morning Leader (launched 2005). All three were severely critical towards the government. He reported critically on both the government and the Tamil Tiger (LTTE) rebels, and the Leader soon became “well known as the island's best independent newspaper". He later stated that once the paper was started, he had intended to return to Law, but found himself unwilling to give up Journalism's excitement. He was also a Writer for Time magazine at this time and was a political commentator and hosted several broadcast programs including Good Morning Sri Lanka.

At the height of his career Wickrematunge was feared by senior ministers and the most powerful in the nation. Political leaders on both sides at various times sought to persuade Wickrematunge offering him ministries of his choice.
The paper quickly drew threats and attacks for its reporting on corruption by government ministers. In 2000, the government tried Wickrematunge for criminal libel of President Chandrika Kumaratunga, but Wickrematunge received no major penalties.

The Leader was particularly critical in its coverage of President Mahinda Rajapaksa. In 2008, Mahinda Rajapaksa, furious over the paper's reporting, called Wickrematunge and shouted at him that he would be killed if the paper's coverage did not change; the president had also described him as a "terrorist journalist".

In the weeks before Wickrematunge's death, a funeral wreath was delivered to him, as well as a copy of the newspaper reading "If you write you will be killed" in red paint. Not wanting to endanger anyone else, Wickrematunge continuously refused to hire a bodyguard.

After the assassination of Wickrematunge, Leader Publications was sold over to a Rajapaksa associate and an unconditional apology was made to Gotabaya Rajapaksa for publishing a series of reports suggesting that he had made corrupt arms deals.

Broadcasting

During the early 90’s Wickrematunge hosted several popular Broadcast Televsion Talk Shows. Wickrematunge worked for TNL TV where he hosted his own nightly political debating segment.Several years in to his political programs with TNL, Wickrematunge was asked by
MTV Channel (owned by the Maharajah Group) to host Good Morning Sri Lanka which he hosted till 2007.

Suranimala 

In the late eighties, Lasantha Wickrematunge while working for Sirimavo Bandaranaike started a whistleblower column in The Sunday Times (Sri Lanka) using the pseudonym “Suranimala”.

Wickrematunge concealed his identity as Suranimala. Soon after it became the most widely read political column in any newspaper in the country. Suranimala became a thorn in the flesh of the   Ranasinghe Premadasa government.
 Wickrematunge as Suranimala wrote on issues that were current and would publish very specific details such as what the President was served for dinner. In one occasion, he wrote of President Premadasa's proposals on devolution which had been submitted confidentially. In Wickrematunge’s investigation’s he had uncovered that “President Premadasa used four different colours of ink” to trace for leaks. Suranimala intentionally mentioned the colour of the ink used in the file copy which led to a crisis in the Presidential Secretariat

At its inception, there was a lot of intrigue in Sri Lanka as to who was behind Suranamila. Both Wickrematunge, as well as his editor, therefore maintained confidentiality.

Wickrematunge took Suranimala with him when he started The Sunday Leader in 1994.

State surveillance and political coercion

During the Rajapaksa regime and the final stages of the Sri Lankan Civil War, Wickrematunge was the country's leading critic of the government and of the war effort and found himself as the target of ongoing political persecution. Wickrematunge was subjected to media scrutiny and campaigns depicting him as a “traitor”. Wickrematunge condemned and spoke out against the treatment and oppression of the Sri Lankan Tamils and opposed Gotabaya Rajapaksa’s war strategies and continually called for a diplomatic solution to the conflict.

Lasantha Wickrematunge investigated corrupt military procurement deals and spoke out strongly for a negotiated settlement to the ethnic conflict and continued to debunk what he saw as  “government propaganda” on the war.
Wickrematunge exposed governmental waste, corruption and excess. Wickrematunge felt that while it was important to eliminate the Liberation Tigers of Tamil Eelam it was important also to respect the lives and rights of Tamil civilians.
Wickrematunge was one of the country’s only leading figures to speak out against the Sri Lankan government during the time of war and 
began to be viewed as “the single biggest stumbling block to all out massacre in the north”.

In 2008 Wickrematunge’s name was added to a “Traitor List” that was published on the Defence Ministry's official website.
 State Intelligence Service (Sri Lanka) began surveilling Wickrematunge's phones

Timeline of attacks

On 7 February 1995, masked assailants pulled Wickrematunge and his first wife Raine, out of their car and attacked them with clubs. Raine later stated that the death threats became part of the routine of their lives: "There were so many threatening calls. 'We are going to kill you. We are going to kill your children.'" 
In 2002, Wickrematunge's then wife left Sri Lanka due to the constant threats against their family, taking their three children to Australia. Years later after the assault, when the hit men who were subsequently apprehended, Wickrematunge asserted that both he and his wife did not wish for the assailants to be punished and asked his lawyer to drop any charges. However Wickrematunge’s lawyer’s had advised him against it because they told him it would be setting a bad precedent.

In June 1998, Wickrematunge began to notice that his home was under surveillance. Wickrematunge reported that a white van with tinted windows was regularly parked outside his family residence. On the night of 17 June 1998, after returning from dinner with his wife and children, Anti-tank bullets were fired at Wickrematunge’s residence while his family were inside their home. Many local and international organisations including the committee to protect journalists, condemned the incident calling it an “attack on free media”. Members of the media and many United National Party parliamentarians and members including then Opposition Leader Ranil Wickremasinghe, visited Wickrematunge’s home to stand in solidarity with him. Mangala Samaraweera, addressing the weekly cabinet press briefing, condemned the shooting on Wickrematunge’s home. 40 spent T56 anti-tank cartridges were also found outside the residence. Wickrematunge said that receiving threats was not unusual for him, and that such threats would come in even during his TV programme telecast on TNL TV which he hosted.

On 5 September 2000, Lasantha Wickrematunge was found guilty of criminally defaming Sri Lankan President Chandrika Kumaratunga in a 1995 article in The Sunday Leader. Wickrematunge was sentenced to two years in jail, suspended for five years.

In January 2005, Wickrematunge exposed the ‘Helping Hambantota’ scandal in the Sunday Leader. The relationship between Wickrematunge and Mahinda Rajapaksa was strained.

Wickrematunge was threatened by President Mahinda Rajapaksa with whom he had a close personal friendship with for over 20 years. Wickrematunge was allegedly abused in foul language in a telephone call on 11 January 2006. According to Wickrematunge, the President had threatened to “destroy him” over a publication in his newspaper involving then First Lady Shiranthi Rajapaksa. Wickrematunge was detained briefly at Bandaranaike International Airport on 21 February 2006 as he arrived for a flight to Geneva. Airport officials had claimed that Wickrematunge required "special permission" to leave Sri Lanka. 
 

In late December 2006, an unsuccessful attempt was made to arrest Wickrematunge, for "Endangering National Security" after he published a report exposing a Rs. 500 million luxury bunker to be built in the presidential complex in his newspaper. Criminal Investigation Department personnel had consulted Sri Lanka's then Attorney General, on the possibility of detaining Wickrematunge under Emergency Regulations.
Wickrematunge addressed the media and a large gathering of supporters outside the premises of The Sunday Leader and stated that he will not seek safe passage overseas and will face arrest and all political oppression levelled against him and “stand unbowed and unafraid”. Due to the public outcry and pressure on the Government by the country's Opposition Party and local and international Human Rights organisations, an arrest was not made.

The printing press of Leader Publications was destroyed in 2007 by an armed gang who stormed the building on the outskirts of Colombo and set the printing press machines on fire. At least 12 masked men carrying T-56 automatic weapons threatened the staff at the building and set it on fire. 

In 2008, Rajapaksa asked his physician  Eliyantha White to speak to Wickrematunge and bring a reconciliation.In October 2008, Mahinda Rajapaksa called Wickrematunge a “terrorist journalist” in an interview. Rajapaksa made these comments to Reporters Without Borders.

On the 6th of January 2009, just two days before Wickrematunge’s assassination, armed assailants broke into the Sirasa television studio complex and destroyed equipment. Wickrematunge arrived at the location with other UNP politicians to condemn the attacks. Wickrematunge made his last public appearance and statement as he condemned the attack on Sirasa and called it an “act of terrorism”

Relationship with Mahinda Rajapaksa

Wickrematunge and Mahinda Rajapaksa first met in the early eighties.
During the Presidency of Chandrika Kumaratunga, Rajapaksa was a minister of the Kumaratunga government.
Wickrematunge would meet with Rajapaksa in secret, late at night and in the early hours of the morning when he knew he would not be followed.Wickrematunge and Rajapaksa would have several intimate meetings weekly. Rajapaksa claimed that Wickrematunge was “one of his very good friends” and that they met often, usually around "midnight".President Kumaratunga who later became aware of these meetings referred to Rajapaksa as a ‘Reporter for Wickrematunge” and alleged that he leaked many government and cabinet secrets to him.

When Rajapaksa was declared as Leader of the Opposition in Parliament on 6th February 2002 following the appointment of Ranil Wickremasinghe as Prime Minister, Wickrematunge welcomed him warmly.
Rajapaksa, climbed the rungs of the Sri Lanka Freedom Party with struggle, and had to work hard to draw support from the party’s grassroots level.
Wickrematunge was among those who helped Rajapaksa come up in to power during this difficult phase in his political career.

After Wickrematunge's assassination in 2009, an ally of Rajapaksa said that "It was Lasantha, and Maithripala Sirisena who worked hard to make him Prime Minister in 2004, when President Kumaratunga tried to give it to Lakshman Kadirgamar."

In late 2004, Basil Rajapaksa had approached Wickrematunge to join and help him run the 2005 Sri Lankan presidential election campaign for Rajapaksa which Wickrematunge declined.

In January 2005, Wickrematunge exposed the ‘Helping Hambantota’ scandal and his newspaper continued to cover the scandal for weeks after Wickrematunge investigated and
unearthed evidence of Prime Minister Rajapaksa’s alleged involvement in transfering over Rs. 80 million of the 2004 Indian Ocean earthquake and tsunami relief funds into a private bank account. Wickrematunge’s investigation resulted in the Criminal Investigation Department (Sri Lanka) inquiry being brought to a standstill by Chief Justice Sarath Silva, who made a apology to the citizen’s of Sri Lanka for ordering the halt of the investigation and allowing Rajapaksa to be elected as President.
Relation’s between Rajapaksa and Wickrematunge were affected. 

After Rajapaksa was elected President in November of that year, the hostility between Wickrematunge and Rajapaksa increased after the President was wrongly informed by a diplomat that “The Sunday Leader was most likely to be the newspaper that would carry a story regarding a alleged visit by the President and his wife to a Hindu temple in India”.
Wickrematunge filed a police complaint against Rajapaksa and published Rajapaksa’s threats to him. 
Rajapaksa and Wickrematunge were from then on sworn enemies and Leader Publications continued week after week to splash investigative stories of alleged corruption in Rajapaksa’s government.   

In 2008, Rajapaksa desired to reconcile with Wickrematunge and requested his physician Lindsay Eliyantha White to bring both wickrematunge and himself back together again. The two had then met and spoken. 
It was also stated at this time that both Wickrematunge and President Rajapaksa had discussed coming together after the war in order to work towards "national unity".

After Wickrematunge’s assassination,
a political figure connected to both President  Rajapaksa and Wickrematunge stated that "President Rajapaksa was deeply stunned and affected by the death of Wickrematunge for several days and still displays a unique discomfort when discussing him".

Legal dispute with Gotabaya Rajapaksa
In August 2007, The Sunday Leader reported on a military contract involving the purchase of Mikoyan MiG-27  Ukrainian fighter aircraft between Gotabaya Rajapaksa, his cousin Udayanga Weeratunga and the Sri Lanka Air Force.
On October 18, 2007, attorney-at-law Ali Sabry and lawyers representing Rajapaksa wrote to Wickrematunge threatening to sue him for defamation for LKR2 billion (€14 million) in damages.
On February 22, 2008, Rajapaksa filed a lawsuit for defamation against Wickrematunge and Leader Publications, charging that the allegations made by Wickrematunge against Rajapaksa were defamatory. Rajapaksa asserted that his role of Defence Secretary “had been adversely affected due to Wickrematunge, creating adverse consequences to the war against the rebels in the battlefield.”

On 5 December 2008, a judge ordered Leader Publications not to publish any reports about Gotabaya Rajapaksa, for two weeks. Several Weeks later, Wickrematunge was assassinated days before he was to testify and give evidence in court.

Assassination

Wickrematunge was shot while he was on his way to work around 10:30 a.m on 8 January 2009, a few days before he was supposed to give evidence against Gotabaya Rajapaksa's alleged corruption in arms deals before a judge. Four armed assassins riding motorcycles blocked Wickrematunge's vehicle before breaking open his window and shooting him. He was taken to the Colombo South Teaching Hospital. It was initially planned with a helicopter on standby to transfer him to the Colombo National Hospital. A specialist team of 20 medical personnel were called in for the surgery. Despite surgery lasting nearly three hours, Wickrematunge died from his head wounds.

Reaction

Wickrematunge's assassination caused an international outcry. Reporters Without Borders
said that "Sri Lanka has lost its more talented, courageous and iconoclastic journalists," and said that "President Mahinda Rajapaksa, his associates and the government media are directly to blame because they incited hatred against him and allowed an outrageous level of impunity to develop as regards violence against the press". President Mahinda Rajapaksa described the assassination as an attempt to discredit the government and said he was both grieved and shocked and stated that he had instructed a thorough police inquiry and called the assassination an “International Conspiracy”.

The Opposition Leader Ranil Wickremesinghe observed that it was part of an anti-democratic conspiracy and accused the government of attempting to silence its critics.
The United National Party, Sri Lanka's main opposition party, also staged a demonstration in parliament on 9 January to protest his assassination. The assassination was condemned by Norway, the United States, the United Kingdom, the European Union, India and Japan, the United Nations strongly condemned the assassination while the World Bank expressed its concerns over the attack.
President Mahinda Rajapaksa told Time (magazine) about Wickrematunge: "He was a good friend of mine. He had informed somebody to inform me that he was in danger. But unfortunately, I didn't get that message. I would have told him to go to the nearest police station. No one knows what happened."

Lord Malloch-Brown Minister of State at the Foreign and Commonwealth Office, said in a statement to the UK Parliament that the British government condemned the killing of Wickrematunge and said that it was the duty of the authorities to take prompt action into these incidents: 

Sri Lankan church leaders voiced their concerns over the attack and the ethnic violence in the Island nation. Anglican Bishop Duleep de Chickera of Colombo said in a statement, "The assassination of Lasantha Wickrematunge, in broad daylight on a public road, has sent shock waves of anger, fear and desperation through the country. This deliberate and senseless act ... is part of a wider and worsening strategy to suppress and silence the media."

In a statement ahead of World Press Freedom Day former United Nations Secretary General Ban Ki Moon called on the government of Sri Lanka to ensure that those responsible for Lasantha Wickrematunge's murder are found and prosecuted.

Investigation
After denying all responsibility for the attack the Rajapaksa government called for an investigation. Despite intense media pressure, no one was arrested, and Sri Lankan media speculated that the murder investigation may "end up as a cover-up", and that safeguards for an independent media appeared bleak.

After Mahinda Rajapaksa's defeat at the presidential election in 2015, the new government of President Maithripala Sirisena reopened the investigation over allegations that former Defence Secretary Gotabhaya Rajapaksa ordered the assassination.

Ranil Wickremesinghe, the former Prime Minister, accused Sarath Fonseka, the former army commander, of the murder of Lasantha Wickrematunge in 2008 and 2009. In 2011, the former MP Rajiva Wijesinha told BBC Sinhala Service that the British High Commission in Colombo had told him it possessed evidence that former military chief Gen Sarath Fonseka was involved in the assassination Lasantha Wickremetunge. According to Sarath Fonseka the order for the assassination was given by Gotabaya

After the elections, Rajapaska requested his departure to be postponed claiming an urgent matter regarding national security. Investigations on assassinations, abductions and assaults on journalist after the fall of the Rajapaksa government revealed that Gotabaya directed a death squad to attack journalists that was outside the Army command structure during this time 17 journalists and media workers were killed and others were either assaulted or abducted.

In July 2016, it was revealed that Dias, who worked as a Chauffeur for Wickrematunge had been blindfolded and abducted by an Army Intelligence officer. Dias, told investigators he was often intoxicated and had been openly alleging that Gotabaya Rajapaksa was behind the assassination of his boss.

Dias was traced and questioned by investigators. He agreed to identify the person who abducted him in a lineup. Dias told the Criminal Investigation Department (Sri Lanka) that the assailant “looked just like his Uncle”. After working with a sketch artist, a key suspect was traced and soon identified by Dias.

In September 2016, an Exhumation of Wickrematunge's remains took place under a court order, after police investigators sought permission for a new examination due to contradictory medical and post mortem examination reports. Wickrematunge's grave in Colombo was under armed guard after a new autopsy request was announced earlier in the month, two months after a Military Intelligence official was arrested in connection with the killing of Wickrematunge.

In October 2016, a retired intelligence officer committed suicide and left a note claiming he is the killer of Wickrematunge and that the intelligence officers that were arrested and under investigation were innocent. The intelligence officer's family reported to Police that they did not believe the officer's death was a suicide.

In December 2016, Investigators travelled to Australia to interview and record statements from Wickrematunge's family. The
Criminal Investigation Department (Sri Lanka)
presented facts pertaining to Wickrematunge's  assassination to the Mount Lavinia Magistrate's court (Sri Lanka).
According to court documents filed, Wickrematunge's daughter told investigators her father warned her he would be killed because of his investigations into the MiG deal.

In November, during the 2018 Sri Lankan constitutional crisis, Nishantha Silva one of the lead investigators in Wickrematunge's case 
was transferred from the Criminal Investigation Department (Sri Lanka) to the Negombo Police division on a service requirement. Wickrematunge's daughter Ahimsa Wickrematunge, condemned the move to transfer Silva in an open letter addressed to President Maithripala Sirisena. The Transfer was stopped upon Wickrematunge's daughters letter.

After the 2019 Sri Lankan presidential election, Silva left Sri Lanka reportedly seeking asylum in Switzerland. 
In July 2020, Shani Abeysekara former senior superintendent of police who headed the Criminal Investigation Department and 
was leading the investigation into Wickrematunge's death was arrested by the Colombo Crimes Division. His family stated they believed he was being targeted for exposing human rights abuses implicating top politicians. Abeysekara was released on bail in June 2021.

In June 2021, Abeysekara wrote to the Sri Lankan Inspector General of Police and the Human Rights Commission of Sri Lanka, requesting protection because he was facing consistent threats of assassination and physical harm due to the work and investigations he carried out.

On the 12th of May 2022, The People's Tribunal in the Hague held a trial producing facts and testimonies in the unsolved assassination of Wickrematunge and two other journalists from Syria and Mexico.
The People’s Tribunal in The Hague found the Government of Sri Lanka guilty of Wickrematunge’s assassination.

U.S lawsuit
In April 2019, Wickrematunge's daughter Ahimsa Wickrematunge filed a civil lawsuit against Gotabaya Rajapaksa in the state of California.
Wickrematunge's daughter's lawsuit alleged that Rajapaksa was behind his death. Rajapaksa, who was visiting the U.S to renounce his citizenship, was served legal documents outside a Trader Joe's parking lot in Pasadena.

Rajapaksa arrived back to Sri Lanka from the United States and was greeted by his supporters and members of the Buddhist Clergy who came to the Bandaranaike International Airport
to stand in solidarity with Rajapaksa. Due to the case filed against him, Rajapaksa's ability to renounce his citizenship was stalled.  
Rajapaksa alleged that the case filed against him by Wickrematunge's daughter was “politically motivated” by the United National Party to stop him from contesting the Presidential Election that year. Rajapaksa took to social media and shared a message later that day that said,

“Touched by the warm welcome. Greatly appreciate your love and support. No one can obstruct me from fulfilling my obligations  to our beloved nation. Ready to serve my country again if and when duty calls.”

United Nations Case

On January 8 2021, On the 12th anniversary of Wickrematunge’s death, Wickrematunge’s daughter filed a complaint with the United Nations's Human Rights Committee against the Government of Sri Lanka, seeking accountability for the regime’s role in the extra judicial killing of her father.In the 29-page complaint, Ahimsa Wickrematunge appealed to the UN to observe  the human rights state of affairs in Sri Lanka, particularly the treatment of its journalists, especially during the periodic review of the country at the UN Human Rights Council that year.

Personal life

Wickrematunge was a teetotaller and a Christian.

Legacy

Wickrematunge's legacy has had a significant influence on the political landscape and the human rights movement and mediain Sri Lanka. Wickrematunge mentored and inspired a generation of Journalists both in his life and after his demise. Internationally Wickrematunge is an icon to champions of freedom of the press and a inspiration to journalists worldwide. Wickrematunge openly advocated parity, peace and a negotiated settlement for the country’s conflict. He condemned the government, as “perhaps the world’s only administration to bomb its own people”. Wickrematunge became a symbol of the only true democratic opposition in Sri Lanka. A symbol of resistance against autocratic regimes, even after his assassination Wickrematunge’s death is a symbol in Sri Lanka today which continues to be used to drive the resistance against tyranny. To Sri Lankan’s, Wickrematunge was viewed as “The backbone of the free media”, “An outstanding member of the Fourth Estate” Throughout his career he spoke out against the systematic ethnic cleansing in the North of the country and a prevalent culture of silence and paranoia. He editorialised and persistently exposed colossal tax evasions and kickbacks from defence deals, of cabinet ministers “organising fake travel documents for assassins and renegade rebel leaders.“ Everything publicized was backed by his incontrovertible investigated evidence.

Wickrematunge championed and spoke out especially in favor of Tamil and Muslim minorities and the rights of the LGBT community in Sri Lanka and is lauded in the Tamil community for his consistent calls for equality and resolution between the Tamil and Sinhalese people.

In 2009, a large monument of Wickrematunge titled “Unbowed and Unafraid” by the sculptor Peter Sandbichler stood displayed outside the Museum of Modern Art in Vienna.
In 2011  St Benedict's College the school of Wickrematunge, announced their Media Unit will be renamed as the ‘Lasantha Wickrematunge Media Unit,’ in memory of Wickrematunge and “loyal old Ben”.
In January 2019, Sajith Premadasa and the Ministry of Housing development announced the construction of a new village in honour of Wickrematunge. Lasantha Wickrematunge Anusmaranagama, the new village for Public Servants hosts 28 houses in honor of Wickrematunge.

During the 2022 Sri Lankan protests many protested to demand accountability and to bring justice for Wickrematunge. Banners and imagery depicting Wickrematunge and quotes by him were used and heavily featured during the protests.

Honours and Awards

In 2009, Wickrematunge was posthumously awarded the UNESCO/Guillermo Cano World Press Freedom Prize. He was also awarded the Louis Lyons Award for Conscience and Integrity in Journalism of Harvard University's Nieman Foundation the James Cameron Memorial Trust Award, and the American National Press Club's John Aubuchon Press Freedom Award. In 2010, Wickrematunge was declared a World Press Freedom Hero of the International Press Institute. In 2016 the East-West Center, Hawaii posthumously conferred the 2016 Courageous Journalism Award on Wickrematunge.

Posthumous editorial

Wickrematunge predicted his own assassination and left a 2,500-word article to be printed in his paper when — not if — he was killed. The editorial was titled "And Then They Came For Me," with a reference to Martin Niemoller’s famous Nazi-era poem First they came for. Forseeing his own death and the responsibility of the state, Wickrematunge addressed president Mahinda Rajapaksa in the editorial letter. 

In “And then they came for me” which Wickrematunge had written shortly before his death, and that was to be published posthumously, he stated, "When finally I am killed, it will be the government that kills me. The Sunday Leader carried the posthumous editorial by Wickrematunge, in which he blamed the government directly for assassinating him and journalists in Sri Lanka as its "primary tool" for controlling the media.

Bibliography

Books
And Then They Came For me Raine Wickrematunge
The Cage (Weiss book)
The Man Within My Head: Graham Greene, My Father and Me Pico Iyer'

See also
Notable assassinations of the Sri Lankan Civil War

References

External links
Dying for Journalism: Lasantha Wickrematunge of Sri Lanka:Time
“And Then They Came For Me”: last words of Lasantha Wickrematunge UNESCO
A Letter from the Grave New York Times

1958 births
2009 deaths
Assassinated Sri Lankan activists
Assassinated Sri Lankan journalists
Deaths by firearm in Sri Lanka
People murdered in Sri Lanka
Sri Lankan journalists
Sinhalese lawyers
20th-century journalists
Recipients of John Aubuchon Press Freedom Award
De Silva family